USS Grenadier (SS-210), a , was the first ship of the United States Navy to be named for the grenadier fish, relatives of cod that are very common in bathyal and abyssal habitats.

Construction and commissioning
Grenadier′s keel was laid down by Portsmouth Navy Yard in Kittery, Maine, in April 1940. She was launched on 29 November 1940, sponsored by Mrs. Virginia E. Anderson, wife of Rear Admiral Walter S. Anderson, Director of Naval Intelligence. Grenadier was commissioned on 1 May 1941 with Lieutenant Commander Allen R. Joyce in command.

Pre-World War II service

After shakedown in the Caribbean Sea, Grenadier returned to Portsmouth on 5 November for refit. Less than three weeks after the Japanese attack on Pearl Harbor, she sailed for the Pacific to join the submarine fleet.

COMSUBPAC patrols, 1942

Grenadiers first war patrol from 4 February to 23 March 1942 took her near the Japanese home islands, off the coast of Honshū, and brought her several targets but no sinkings. On 12 April Grenadier, now under command of LCDR Willis Lent, departed Pearl Harbor for her second war patrol, along the Shanghai-Yokohama and Nagasaki-Formosa shipping lanes. On 8 May she torpedoed and sank one of her most important victories of the war, transport . Post-war examination of Japanese records showed Taiyō Maru to be more than just the ordinary transport; she was en route to the East Indies with a group of Japanese scientists, economists, and industrial experts, including renowned hydraulic engineer Yoichi Hatta who designed Chianan Irrigation and built Wusanto Reservoir in Taiwan, bent on expediting the exploitation of the conquered territory. Their loss was a notable blow to the Japanese war effort.

On 25 May 1942, Grenadier was diverted from her patrol area to Midway Atoll in the Northwestern Hawaiian Islands, where she formed part of the submarine patrol line as the American fleet in a bloody but brilliant battle handed the Imperial Navy its first defeat in some three hundred years. Grenadiers third war patrol was in the Truk area, heavily patrolled by enemy ships and planes. Although she sighted some 28 Japanese ships, enemy planes effectively hampered her, and she returned to her new base, Fremantle, Australia, empty-handed.

Deployment to Australia

The Malay Barrier was the site of Grenadiers fourth war patrol from 13 October to 10 December. After laying a minefield off Haiphong, Indochina, the submarine made an unsuccessful attack on a large freighter. During the severe depth charging which followed, sea water seeped into the batteries; Grenadiers crew suffered headaches and nausea from chlorine gas poisoning for the remainder of the patrol. To increase the misery, on 20 November Grenadier spotted a -class aircraft carrier, escorted by a cruiser and a destroyer, heading through the Strait of Makassar too distant to shoot. Grenadier surfaced to radio the aircraft carrier's location and course to Fremantle submarine base in hope that another submarine could capitalize on it.

Grenadiers fifth war patrol, under the command of LCDR John Allison Fitzgerald, between 1 January and 20 February 1943, brought her considerably better fortune than earlier patrols. A 75-ton schooner fell victim to her deck guns 10 January, and two days later Grenadier sighted a small tanker with a barge in tow. Judging the target not worth a torpedo, she slipped silently into the column behind the two Japanese ships. At dusk she battle surfaced. With binoculars lashed to the deck guns as sights, she raked the tanker and barge, sinking them immediately. The remainder of her patrol, along the Borneo coast through shallow and treacherous waters, was hampered by fathometer failures. She conducted an aggressive attack on two cargo ships 22 January but did not sink them.

The submarine departed Australia on 20 March on her last war patrol and headed for the Strait of Malacca, gateway between the Pacific and Indian Oceans. Patrolling along the Malay and Thai coasts, Grenadier claimed a small freighter off the island of Phuket on 6 April.

Loss
She remained in the area and late in the night of 20 April sighted two merchantmen and closed in for the attack. Running on the surface at dawn 21 April, Grenadier spotted, and was simultaneously spotted by, a Japanese plane. The submarine dived, and as it passed  her executive officer commented, "We ought to be safe now." Just then, explosions rocked Grenadier and heeled her over 15 to 20 degrees. She tried to make repairs, while a fierce fire blazed in the maneuvering room.

After 13 hours of sweating it out on the bottom Grenadier, managed to surface after dark to clear the boat of smoke and inspect damage. The damage to her propulsion system was irreparable. Attempting to bring his ship closer to shore so that the crew could scuttle her and escape into the jungle, Commander Fitzgerald even tried to jury-rig a sail. But the long night's work proved futile. As dawn broke on 22 April, Grenadiers weary crew sighted two Japanese ships heading for them. One, IJN netlayer Choko Maru, began ineffective shelling. The skipper "didn't think it advisable to make a stationary dive in 280 feet of water without power," and the crew began burning confidential documents prior to abandoning ship. A Japanese plane attacked the stricken submarine, but Grenadier, though dead in the water and to all appearances helpless, blazed away with her machine guns. She hit the plane on its second pass. Opening all vents, the crew of Grenadier abandoned ship and watched her sink to her final resting place. Choko Maru picked up eight officers and 68 enlisted men and took them to Penang, Malay States, where they were questioned, beaten, and starved before being sent to other prison camps. They were then separated and transferred from camp to camp along the Malay Peninsula and finally to Japan. Throughout the war they suffered brutal, inhuman treatment, and their refusal to reveal military information frustrated and angered their captors. First word that any had survived Grenadier reached Australia on 27 November 1943. Despite the brutal and sadistic treatment, all but four of Grenadiers crew survived their two years in Japanese hands.

Honors and awards
Grenadier received four battle stars for World War II service.

Discovery of wreck
Announced in 2020, the discovery of the wreck came in a series of dives as part of a six-month, $110,000 expedition beginning in October 2019. The divers sent their findings to the Naval History and Heritage Command for verification; confirmation will place the wreck under the protections of the Sunken Military Craft Act.

References

Citations

Bibliography
 Hinman, Charles R., and Douglas E. Campbell. The Submarine Has No Friends: Friendly Fire Incidents Involving U.S. Submarines During World War II. Syneca Research Group, Inc., 2019. .

Further reading

External links 

 On Eternal Patrol: USS Grenadier
 Combined Fleet entry for Taiyo Maru

 

Tambor-class submarines
World War II submarines of the United States
Lost submarines of the United States
Submarines sunk by aircraft
Ships built in Kittery, Maine
1940 ships
Friendly fire incidents of World War II
Maritime incidents in May 1942
Maritime incidents in April 1943
World War II shipwrecks in the Strait of Malacca
Ships sunk by Japanese aircraft